Yue Wan is one of the 35 constituencies in the Eastern District, Hong Kong.

The constituency returns one district councillor to the Eastern District Council, with an election every four years. It is currently held by independent Chui Chi-kin.

Yue Wan constituency is loosely based on the Yue Wan Estate, Chai Wan Estate and Lok Hin Terrace in Chai Wan with estimated population of 14,926.

Councillors represented

Election results

2010s

2000s

1990s

Notes

References

Chai Wan
Constituencies of Hong Kong
Constituencies of Eastern District Council
1994 establishments in Hong Kong
Constituencies established in 1994